Qazi Saleem is an Indian politician, elected to the Lok Sabha, the lower house of the Parliament of India as a member of the Indian National Congress.

References

External links
Official biographical sketch in Parliament of India website

India MPs 1980–1984
Lok Sabha members from Maharashtra
1930 births
Living people